Digby is an American power pop band originally formed in January 2000 in Louisville, Kentucky. They had been known as 100 Acre Wood before that. The band is fairly popular within the city and surrounding area. During 2000, Digby released its first album, Laughing at the Trees. In 2004, they released their most notable album to date, Falling Up, on June 1, 2004, under the Toucan Cove/Label X label. The album was produced by Todd Smith, who has done work with Days of the New and Smash Mouth. The album debuted #1 on the ear X-tacy sales chart, #92 on the CIMS sales chart, #20 on R&R's specialty chart, and #7 on FMQB's Submodern Report.

Discography
 Laughing at the Trees (2000)
 Go Digby (2003)
 Falling Up (2004)
 Falling Over: The Remix EP (2005)
 What's Not Plastic? (2007)

External links
 Digby MySpace page
 Digby's MTV artist page
 

Rock music groups from Kentucky
Musical groups from Louisville, Kentucky
American power pop groups
2000 establishments in Kentucky